Carlos Henrique Raimundo Rodrigues (born December 24, 1976), known as just Henrique, is a former Brazilian football player.

Playing career
Henrique joined Japanese J1 League club Verdy Kawasaki in 1999. He played many matches as forward with many young players due to financial strain end of 1998 season. Verdy finished at the 7th place in 1999 season. He left the club end of 1999 season.

Club statistics

References

External links

1976 births
Living people
Brazilian footballers
Brazilian expatriate footballers
Expatriate footballers in Japan
J1 League players
Tokyo Verdy players
Association football forwards
Brazilian expatriate sportspeople in Japan